Mark Bamford may refer to:

 Mark Bamford (cricketer) (born 1980), English cricketer
 Mark Bamford (film director), American film director